Sándor Ernszt (21 April 1870 – 19 November 1938) was a Hungarian politician, who served as Minister of Religion and Education in 1931. He also served as Minister of Welfare and Labour from 1930.

References
 Magyar Életrajzi Lexikon

1870 births
1938 deaths
Hungarian people of German descent
Education ministers of Hungary